Pavel Kokin (born 21 July 1974) is a Russian long-distance runner. He competed in the men's marathon at the 2000 Summer Olympics.

References

1974 births
Living people
Place of birth missing (living people)
Russian male long-distance runners
Russian male marathon runners
Olympic male marathon runners
Olympic athletes of Russia
Athletes (track and field) at the 2000 Summer Olympics
Russian Athletics Championships winners